Montenegrin music festivals are a series of music festivals which showcase the top Montenegrin and all Ex-Yugoslavian musical acts, in different types of music. They usually involve live performances as well as awards given by festival jurors and those awarded by the fans. The majority of the festivals release a compilation of the songs entered.

Pop Festivals 

 MontenegroSong
 The winner of this festival is representing Montenegro in the Eurovision Song Contest. It's organised by RTCG and the first edition was in 2007. While Montenegro was in the union with Serbia, the Montenegrin semifinal was called Montevizija.
 Music Festival Budva
 It takes place in the town of Budva and usually takes place in June. It was held each year from 1992 until today, except in 1999 and 2002.
 Sunčane Skale
 This festival is held in Herceg Novi. Many state that this is the biggest music festival in the region.

Folk Festivals 

 Cetinje Fest
 A festival held annually in Cetinje. The first edition, Tivatfest, was held in the city of Tivat in August 2005, while the second was held in Bar and named Barfest. The festival focuses mainly on traditional folk music of the region, and the organizers aren't allowing turbo-folk songs to participate.

Children's music festivals 

 Zlatna Pahulja and Zlatna Staza
 These two festivals are held in Rožaje. Zlatna Pahulja focuses on the younger singers, while Zlatna Staza is for the older ones. They were first held in 1995.
 Male Skale
 Male Skale festival is held in Bijela, near Herceg Novi. Started in 2005.

Festivals with no competitive character 

 Live Fest
 Held annually on Jaz beach near Budva. It consists of performances of both internationally popular stars and famous Ex-Yu singers. The first edition was held in August 2008, and lasted for 3 days (with performances by: Lenny Kravitz, Armand Van Helden, Dino Merlin, Goran Bregović, Zdravko Čolić)
 Refresh Festival
 Held annually in Maximus superclub in Kotor. Consists of performances of international and local electronic music stars and DJs. First held in August 2007.

Music festivals in Montenegro